"Je marche seul" ("I Walk Alone") is the name of a 1985 song recorded by the French singer and songwriter Jean-Jacques Goldman. It was released in June 1985 as the first single from his album Non homologué, as tenth track. Though the song failed to reach number one on the French Singles Chart, it remains one of Goldman's biggest hit singles as well as one of his more popular songs live.

Lyrics and music
The upbeat song begins with a long musical introduction highlighted by a sax solo.

When the song was released as a single, Goldman explained in various interviews that the song was very hard to compose. The lyrics describe someone walking alone along a road, annomyous and lost in thought, able to forget everything for the moment and the pleasure of being anonymous while observing the world. Goldman has said that "Je marche seul" is a bright song because "the loneliness is not a punishment".

The music video, produced by Bernard Schmitt in Brussels, began to be aired on television in May 1985. It was well received in the media at the time. It shows Goldman portraying a renegade from Eastern Europe who has an affair in a train which is crossing the border.

Jean-Jacques Goldman said in an interview that even before the release of the song in the media, he was sure to have a hit: "So, for "Je marche seul", I had no doubt!"

Live performances
On 13 October 1985, Goldman performed the song as duet with Daniel Balavoine during the charity concert of the 'Chanteurs sans frontières' in La Courneuve to raise funds for Ethiopia. The song was later included in Goldman's best of Intégrale and Singulier. It was performed during the singer's tours, and thus is available in the original version on Un tour ensemble, and in a medley version on En public, Traces and Intégrale.

On the television show Zénith, presented by Michel Denisot in December 1986, Goldman performed several of his songs in China. The shooting of "Je marche seul" took place in the Nankin avenue, in Shanghai, and shows the singer walking among thousands of Chinese.

Cover versions
The song was covered by Jean-Félix Lalanne in 1990, by Eric Landman in 2000 for his album Eric Landman chante Jean-Jacques Goldman, and by Le Collège de l'Esterel in 2002. The most popular cover is that of Les Enfoirés, performed by Muriel Robin, Pierre Palmade, Gérard Jugnot, Axel Bauer, Zazie, Hélène Ségara and Natasha St-Pier, from the 2004 concert, available on the album 2004: Les Enfoirés dans l'espace.

The song was also recorded in Dutch-language by Bart Herman, under the title "Ik loop alleen".

In 2012, Christophe Willem covered the song on the number one album Génération Goldman.

Chart performances
The single had a long chart run on the French Singles Chart: it stayed in the top 50 for 30 weeks, from 22 June 1985 to 11 January 1986. It debuted at number 25, reached the top ten four weeks later, where it remained for 14 consecutive weeks, with a peak at number two in its 11th and 15th weeks; then it dropped slowly on the chart. The same year, it was certified Gold disc by the SNEP.

Track listings
 7" single
 "Je marche seul" — 4:03
 "Elle attend" — 3:17

 12" maxi
 "Je marche seul" (extended) — 5:58
 "Elle attend" — 3:15

Personnel
 Jean-Jacques Goldman — singing, backing vocals, acoustic guitar, electric guitar and piano
 Guy Delacroix — bass, programming
 Patrick Bourgoin — saxophone
 P.A. Dahan — drums
 Roland Romanelli — synthesizers
 Patrice Mondon — violin

Charts and certifications

References

External links
 "Je marche seul", story, lyrics and anecdotes ("Chansons" => "En un clic" => "Je marche seul")

1985 singles
Jean-Jacques Goldman songs
Songs written by Jean-Jacques Goldman
1985 songs
Epic Records singles